= Missouri Society of Certified Public Accountants =

The Missouri Society of CPAs (MOCPA) is a professional association for the Certified Public Accountant (CPA) profession in Missouri.

The organization was formed on June 18, 1909, by twenty-three CPAs from St. Louis. The Society represents over 8,000 members in the practicing accounting in public practice, industry, government, and education.
